Balakhtinsky District is an administrative and municipal district (raion), one of the forty-three in Krasnoyarsk Krai, Russia. It is located in the southwest of the krai and borders with Kozulsky and Yemelyanovsky Districts in the north, Beryozovsky District in the northeast, Mansky District in the east, Kuraginsky District in the southeast, Idrinsky, Krasnoturansky, and Novosyolovsky Districts in the south, Uzhursky District in the west, and with Nazarovsky District in the northwest. Its administrative center is the urban locality (an urban-type settlement) of Balakhta. Population:  25,518 (2002 Census);  The population of Balakhta accounts for 35.3% of the district's total population.

Geography
The district is situated in the valley between the Chulym and Yenisei Rivers.

History
The district was founded on April 4, 1924.

Government
As of 2013, the Head of the district is Nikolay M. Yurtayev.

Demographics
As of the 2002 Census, the ethnic composition of the population was as follows:
Russians: 86.4%
Germans: 6.3%
Chuvash: 1.8%
Ukrainians: 1.4%
Mordvins: 0.7%
Belarusians: 0.6%
Tatars: 0.5%
Khakas: 0.1%

The rate of the natural decline of the district population was 4.3 persons per 1,000 in 2009, which is in sharp contrast to the krai's average increase of 0.2 persons per 1,000.

References

Notes

Sources

Districts of Krasnoyarsk Krai
States and territories established in 1924